Anthology 2: Classic Hits 1967–1985 (Recorded Live) is a greatest hits compilation album by Australian singer John Farnham. The album was released in Australia on 29 September 1997, and is the second of a three disc Anthology set. The album features live recorded version of Farnhams "Classic Hits", rare soundtrack songs as well as a cover of Australian band Cold Chisels, "When the War Is Over" and the Beatles classic hit "And I Love Her".

Performance
This album peaked at No. 12 in the ARIA charts.

Track listing
 "Sadie (The Cleaning Lady) [Live]" (Gilmore, Madara) – 1:22
 "One [Live]" (H. Nilsson) – 2:57
 "Looking Through A Tear [Live]" (B. Scott, A. Resnick) – 3:47
 "Raindrops Keep Falling on My Head [Live]" (B. Bacharach, H. David) – 3:08
 "Comic Conversation [Live]" (J. Bromley) – 3:52
 "Don't You Know It's Magic [Live]" (B. Cadd) – 4:07
 "Everything Is Out Of Season [Live]" (Cook, Greenway) – 2:54
 "Help! [Live]" (J. Lennon, P. McCartney) – 4:49
 "Matilda [Live]" (G. Goble) – 4:17
 "Infatuation [Live]" (M. Brady, G. Goble) – 2:43
 "That's No Way To Love Someone [Live]" (J. Farnham, S. McNally, J. Nicholls, R. Leigh) – 2:51
 "Please Don't Ask Me][Live]" (G. Goble) – 3:24
 "Playing To Win [Live]" (G. Goble, J. Farnham, D. Hirschfelder, S. Housden, S. Proffer, W. Nelson, S. Prestwich) – 3:01
 "Justice For One [Live]" (J. Farnham, S. Shifrin) – 3:28
 "When The War Is Over [Live]" (S. Prestwich) – 5:31
 "And I Love Her" (J. Lennon, P. McCartney) – 3:30

Charts

Weekly charts

Year-end charts

Certifications

References 

John Farnham compilation albums
John Farnham live albums
1997 live albums
1997 greatest hits albums